Thomas Boynton (1523–1582), of Acklam and Barmston, Yorkshire, was an English politician.

He was a Member (MP) of the Parliament of England for Boroughbridge in 1571 and for Cumberland in 1572.

References

1523 births
1582 deaths
Members of the Parliament of England for constituencies in Yorkshire
English MPs 1571
English MPs 1572–1583